Hexaprenyl-diphosphate synthase ((2E,6E)-farnesyl-diphosphate specific) (HexPS, hexaprenyl pyrophosphate synthetase, hexaprenyl diphosphate synthase) is an enzyme with systematic name (2E,6E)-farnesyl-diphosphate:isopentenyl-diphosphate farnesyltranstransferase (adding 3 isopentenyl units). This enzyme catalyses the following chemical reaction

 (2E,6E)-farnesyl diphosphate + 3 isopentenyl diphosphate  3 diphosphate + all-trans-hexaprenyl diphosphate

The enzyme prefers farnesyl diphosphate to geranylgeranyl diphosphate as an allylic substrate.

References

External links 

EC 2.5.1